Zdislav Soroko is a Soviet sprint canoer who competed in the late 1970s. He won a bronze medal in the C-1 500 m event at the 1977 ICF Canoe Sprint World Championships in Sofia.

References

Living people
Soviet male canoeists
Year of birth missing (living people)
Russian male canoeists
ICF Canoe Sprint World Championships medalists in Canadian